The red corridor, also called the red zone, is the region in the eastern, central and the southern parts of India where the Naxalite–Maoist insurgency has the strongest presence. It has been steadily diminishing in terms of geographical coverage and number of violent incidents, and in 2021 it was confined to 25 "most affected" (accounting for 85% of LWE violence) and 70 "total affected" districts (down from 180 in 2009) across 10 states in two coal rich, remote, forested hilly clusters in and around Dandakaranya-Chhattisgarh-Odisha region and tri-junction area of Jharkhand-Bihar and-West Bengal.

The Naxalite group mainly consists of the Guevarist armed cadres of the Communist Party of India (Maoist). These areas span parts of Andhra Pradesh, Bihar, Chhattisgarh, Jharkhand, Madhya Pradesh, Maharashtra, Odisha, Telangana and West Bengal.

All forms of Naxalite organisations have been declared as terrorist organizations under the Unlawful Activities (Prevention) Act of India (1967).

Socio-economic conditions

Economic condition 

The districts that make up the red corridor are among the poorest in the country. Areas such as Jharkhand, Odisha, Chhattisgarh and Telangana (formerly part of Andhra Pradesh), are either impoverished or have significant economic inequality, or both.

A key characteristic of this region is non-diversified economies that are solely primary sector based. Agriculture, sometimes supplemented with mining or forestry, is the mainstay of the economy, which is often unable to support rapid increases in population. The region has significant natural resources, including mineral, forestry and potential hydroelectric generation capacity. Odisha, for example, "has 60 percent of India’s bauxite reserves, 25 percent of coal, 28 percent of iron ore, 92 percent of nickel and 28 percent of manganese reserves."

Social condition

The area encompassed by the red corridor tends to have stratified societies, with caste and feudal divisions. Much of the area has high tribal populations (or adivasis), including Santhal and Gond. Bihar and Jharkhand have both caste and tribal divisions and violence associated with friction between these social groups. Andhra Pradesh's Telangana region similarly has deep caste divide with a strict social hierarchical arrangement. Both Chhattisgarh and Odisha have significant impoverished tribal populations.

Territories of the red corridor

Affected districts

As of June 2021, 70 districts across 10 states are affected by Naxalist extremism.

The Odisha gap

The red corridor is almost contiguous from India's border with Nepal to the absolute northernmost fringes of Tamil Nadu. There is, however, a significant gap consisting of coastal and some central areas in Odisha state, where Naxalite activity is low and indices of literacy and economic diversification are higher. However, the non-coastal districts of Odisha, which fall in the red corridor have significantly lower indicators, and literacy throughout the region is well below the national average.

See also

 Revolutionary base area
 Naxalite and Maoist groups in India
 Timeline of the Naxalite-Maoist insurgency
 Scheduled Tribes in India  
 Separatist movements of India
 Terrorism in India
 List of terrorist incidents in India
 List of communist parties in India

References

Communist Party of India (Maoist)
Regions of India
Maoism in India
Naxalite–Maoist insurgency
Mining in India